Baron Moyne, of Bury St Edmunds in the County of Suffolk, is a title in the Peerage of the United Kingdom. It was created in 1932 for the Hon. Walter Guinness, a Conservative politician. A member of the prominent Guinness brewing family, he was the third son of the 1st Earl of Iveagh, who was himself the third son of Sir Benjamin Guinness, 1st Baronet, of Ashford.

His son, the 2nd Baron, was a poet and novelist. He was the first husband of Diana Mitford, one of the famous Mitford sisters, who went on to marry the fascist Sir Oswald Mosley.

, the title is held by their eldest son, the 3rd Baron, who succeeded in July 1992. As a male agnatic descendant of both the 1st Earl of Iveagh and the first Guinness Baronet of Ashford, he is also in remainder to those two titles.

Barons Moyne (1932)
Walter Edward Guinness, 1st Baron Moyne (1880–1944)
Bryan Walter Guinness, 2nd Baron Moyne (1905–1992)
Jonathan Bryan Guinness, 3rd Baron Moyne (b. 1930)

The heir apparent is the present holder's second but eldest-surviving son, the Hon. Valentine Guy Bryan Guinness (b. 1959).
The heir apparent's heir presumptive is his half-brother, the Hon. Sebastian Walter Denis Guinness (b. 1964).

See also
Guinness Baronets, of Ashford
Earl of Iveagh
Guinness family

References

Baronies in the Peerage of the United Kingdom
1932 establishments in the United Kingdom
 
Baron Moyne
Noble titles created in 1932
Noble titles created for UK MPs